Ocean Elders is a worldwide group of activists dedicated to protecting the ocean, wildlife, and nature itself. The  group promotes the expansion of existing marine protected areas and the creation of new ones. The group maintains that this will allow marine ecosystems to recover from the effects caused by human activities.  The group includes scientists, musicians, business leaders, royalty, and country leaders.

History 
The group was formed in 2011 by Gigi Brisson.

Recent activity 

In 2016, members of the group visited Cuba as part of a delegation to meet leaders from government, academia and civil society. The goal of the visit was to learn about the measures that have been taken to protect the local marine ecosystems.

In 2017, Ocean Elders wrote to Malcolm Turnbull (then Prime Minister of Australia) with petition to reject the Carmichael coal mine, proposed by Adani Group. The activists argued that the coal mine would have a devastating impact on the Great Barrier Reef.

References

External links 

 

Ecology organizations
Oceanography